[[File:Heliesund Harbour (JW Edy, plate 02).jpg|thumb|Ny-Hellesund anno 1800, picturesque scenery of Norway]]
John William Edy (1760 – 1820) was an English painter. He worked for the publisher John Boydell in London, often anonymously. In the summer of 1800 Edy visited Norway on an assignment for Boydell together with the landscape painter William Fearnside. They were in Norway from July 31 and until the end of September the same year.

Edy made numerous drawings from the trip, among them drawings of Ny-Hellesund which was the place the two artists arrived at in Norway. In Norway he is also known for his drawings of Christiania and Moss. Boydells Picturesque Scenerey of Norway'' was published in London in 1820.

External links 

 Boydell's picturesque scenery of Norway, full version at the Norwegian National Library

1760 births
1820 deaths
18th-century English painters
English male painters
19th-century English painters
Landscape artists
19th-century English male artists
18th-century English male artists